Udoh is a surname.  Notable people with this name include:
Daniel Udoh, Nigerian footballer
Ekpe Udoh, an American NBA basketball player
Kingsley Udoh, a Nigerian footballer that plays for Llaneros F.C.
Mercy Akide Udoh, a former Nigerian footballer
Nnamdi Udoh, a Nigerian airspace manager
Oli Udoh (born 1997), American football player
Saviour Friday Udoh, a Nigerian politician